Tlachichilco Tepehua is a Tepehua language of Veracruz, Mexico.

Phonology

Vowels

Consonants 

 The uvular ejective [qʼ] is only phonemically present in other dialects.
 Rhotic sounds [ɾ, r] only occur from either Spanish loan words or onomatopoetic words.

References

Totonacan languages

Languages of Mexico